This article shows the rosters of all participating teams at the men's Volleyball tournament at the 2015 Pan American Games in Toronto. Rosters can have a maximum of 12 athletes.

















References

Volleyball at the 2015 Pan American Games